The Zeditave Stakes is a Melbourne Racing Club Group 3 Thoroughbred horse race for three-year-old colts and geldings, held with set weights with penalties conditions, over a distance of 1200 metres at Caulfield Racecourse in Melbourne, Australia in February. Prize money for the race is A$200,000.

History
The race is named after the 1988 Blue Diamond Stakes and 1989 Futurity Stakes winner, Zeditave. Between 2005–2013 the race was run on Australia Day holiday. Since 2014 the race has been run on the Blue Diamond Stakes / Futurity Stakes racecard.

Name
1989 - The Peter Jackson
1990 onwards - Zeditave Stakes

Grade
 1989–2013 - Listed race
 2014 onwards - Group 3

Venue
1989–1993 - Caulfield Racecourse 
1994–1996 - Sandown Racecourse
1997–2005 - Caulfield Racecourse 
2006 - Sandown Racecourse
2007–2022 - Caulfield Racecourse
2023 - Sandown Racecourse

Conditions
 prior 2005 - Three-year-olds
 2005 onwards - Three-year-old colts and geldings

Winners

 2023 - Recommendation
 2022 - Finance Tycoon
 2021 - Oxley Road
 2020 - He'll Haunt Us 
 2019 - Terbium 
 2018 - Overshare 
 2017 - Benz 
 2016 - Santa Ana Lane 
 2015 - Rommel 
 2014 - Not Listenin'tome 
 2013 - Happy Galaxy
 2012 - Instinction
 2011 - Eclair Mystic
 2010 - Denman
 2009 - Time Thief
 2008 - Bundle O' Gold
 2007 - Haradasun
 2006 - Minson
 2005 - Not A Single Doubt 
 2004 - St Elmo's Fire 
 2003 - Innovation Girl 
 2002 - Barkada 
 2001 - Desert Eagle
 2000 - Pins
 1999 - Destruction Point
 1998 - Blaze The Turf
 1997 - Catainer
 1996 - Street Talk
 1995 - Hurricane Sky
 1994 - Superact
 1993 - Oozook
 1992 - My Saturn Star
 1991 - Paklani 
 1990 - Tango Master 
 1989 - Almurtajaz

See also
 List of Australian Group races
 Group races

References

Horse races in Australia